The Prva HNL Player of the Year award is an annual association football award given by the Croatian web portal Tportal.hr. It is awarded to the best football player who plays in the Prva HNL (or "1. HNL"), Croatian top flight. The winner is chosen by captains of all Prva HNL clubs.

The award was established in 2003. Eduardo and Sammir hold the record for most wins with two awards. The current award holder is Dani Olmo of GNK Dinamo Zagreb.

Another similar award is the Yellow Shirt Award which is based on aggregate player ratings in matches throughout the season as judged by the country's only sports daily Sportske novosti.

Winners

See also
Sportske novosti Yellow Shirt award, for the HNL footballer of the year, given by the Croatian sport newspaper Sportske novosti, chosen by sport journalists.
Croatian Footballer of the Year, given by the Croatian newspaper Večernji list, chosen by sport journalists. 
Football Oscar, given by the Croatian union Football syndicate, chosen by players and managers of league clubs.

References

External links
Complete list of winners 2003–2014

Croatian football trophies and awards
Awards established in 2003
 
2003 establishments in Croatia
Annual events in Croatia
Association football player non-biographical articles